Girl on a Bicycle is a 1977 novel by Leland Bardwell (her first).  The novel is set in 1940s Ireland, and deals with the reality of being Protestant and what it means to be an individual caught up in the momentum of historical change.  It is a coming-of-age story for Julie Da Vraire as she makes her way on her own after being socially outcast.

Reception
Anthony Burgess (author of A Clockwork Orange) described the novel as "a period gem". Senator David Norris sees the work as the "best Irish big house novel of the 20th century".

Frances Molloy's No Mate for the Magpie, published in 1985, as well as the works of Mary Dorcey and Evelyn Cordon, have been compared to the style of Girl on a Bicycle.

Publication history
1977: Dublin: Irish Writers Co-operative. - 160 pages. - . - .
2009: Dublin: Liberties Press. - 192 pages. - . - .
(Chester Springs, Pennsylvania: Dufour Editions - U.S. distributor).

References

Irish historical novels
20th-century Irish novels
Irish bildungsromans
1977 debut novels
Novels set in the 1940s